Ola Hansen Kveli (23 April 1921 – 22 April 2003) was a Norwegian politician for the Liberal Party and later the Liberal People's Party.

He was elected to the Norwegian Parliament from Nord-Trøndelag in 1969. During his second term, in December 1972, Kveli joined the Liberal People's Party which split from the Liberal Party over disagreements of Norway's proposed entry to the European Economic Community. Like most of the Liberal People's Party representatives, he was not re-elected in 1973.

He had previously served in the position of deputy representative during the terms 1961–1965 and 1965–1969. During both these terms he served as a regular representative meanwhile Bjarne Lyngstad was appointed to the cabinet Lyng (1963) and cabinet Borten (from 1965).

Kveli was born in Nordli and mayor of Nordli municipality council from 1951 to 1963, and of its successor municipality Lierne in 1963–1965. His political career ended with the post of County Governor of Nord-Trøndelag, which he held from 1979 to 1991.

Kveli is also a former leader of Det Norske Totalavholdsselskap, Norway's oldest temperance organization.

References

1921 births
2003 deaths
Members of the Storting
Liberal Party (Norway) politicians
Liberal People's Party (Norway, 1972) politicians
Mayors of places in Nord-Trøndelag
County governors of Norway
20th-century Norwegian politicians